Girish Karnad (19 May 1938 – 10 June 2019) was an Indian actor, film director, Kannada writer, playwright and a Jnanpith awardee, who predominantly worked in South Indian cinema and Bollywood. His rise as a playwright in the 1960s marked the coming of age of modern Indian playwriting in Kannada, just as Badal Sarkar did in Bengali, Vijay Tendulkar in Marathi, and Mohan Rakesh in Hindi. He was a recipient of the 1998 Jnanpith Award, the highest literary honour conferred in India.

For four decades Karnad composed plays, often using history and mythology to tackle contemporary issues. He translated his plays into English and received acclaim. His plays have been translated into some Indian languages and directed by directors like Ebrahim Alkazi, B. V. Karanth, Alyque Padamsee, Prasanna, Arvind Gaur, Satyadev Dubey, Vijaya Mehta, Shyamanand Jalan, Amal Allanaa and Zafer Mohiuddin.

He was active in the world of Indian cinema working as an actor, director and screenwriter, in Hindi and Kannada cinema, and has earned awards.

He was conferred Padma Shri and Padma Bhushan by the Government of India and won four Filmfare Awards, of which three are Filmfare Award for Best Director – Kannada and the fourth a Filmfare Best Screenplay Award. He was a presenter for a weekly science magazine programme called "Turning Point" that aired on Doordarshan in 1991.

Early life and education
Girish Karnad was born in Chitrapur Saraswat Brahmin family of Matheran, in present-day Maharashtra, in 1938. His mother Krishnabai (née Mankikar) was a young widow with a son who belonged to a poor family. Since it was necessary for her to earn a living, she began working as a nurse and cook (general housekeeper) for the bedridden wife of a certain Raghunath Karnad, a doctor in the Bombay Medical Services. He was from the Konkani speaking Chitrapur Saraswat Brahmin community.

Some five years later, and while the first wife was still alive, Krishnabai and Dr. Raghunath Karnad were married in a private ceremony. The marriage was controversial not because of bigamy (it was legal until 1956 for a Hindu man to have more than one wife) but because of the prevailing social prejudice against widow remarriage. Therefore, the wedding was held privately, and under the dispensation of the Arya Samaj, a reform organization that condones widow remarriage. Girish was the third of the four children born thereafter.

Karnad's initial schooling was in Marathi. Later, after his father was transferred to Sirsi in the Kannada-speaking regions of Bombay Presidency, Karnad was exposed to travelling theatre groups and nataka mandalis (theatre troupes), which were experiencing a period of efflorescence during the iconic Balgandharva era . As a youngster, he was an ardent admirer of Yakshagana and the theater in his village. His family moved to Dharwad in Karnataka when he was fourteen, where he grew up with his two sisters and a niece.

He earned his Bachelor of Arts degree in mathematics and statistics from Karnataka Arts College, Dharwad (Karnataka University), in 1958. After graduation, he went to England and studied Philosophy, Politics and Economics at Magdalen in Oxford as a Rhodes Scholar (1960–63), earning his Master of Arts degree in philosophy, political science and economics. Karnad was elected the President of the Oxford Union in 1962–63.

Career
After working with the Oxford University Press, Chennai for seven years (1963–70), he resigned to take to writing full-time. While in Madras (now known as Chennai) he got involved with local amateur theatre group, The Madras Players.

During 1987–88, he was at the University of Chicago as visiting professor and Fulbright playwright-in-residence. During his tenure at Chicago Nagamandala had its world premiere at the Guthrie Theater in Minneapolis based on Karnad's English translation of the Kannada original.

He served as director of the Film and Television Institute of India (1974–1975) and chairman of the Sangeet Natak Akademi, the national academy of the performing arts (1988–93). He served as director of the Nehru Centre and as Minister of Culture, in the Indian High Commission, London (2000–2003).

Literature

Karnad is known as a playwright. His plays, written in Kannada, have been translated into English (mostly translated by himself) and some Indian languages. Kannada is his language of choice.

When Karnad started writing plays, Kannada literature was highly influenced by the renaissance in Western literature. Writers would choose a subject that looked entirely alien to manifestation of native soil. C. Rajagopalachari's version of the Mahabharata published in 1951, left a deep impact on him and soon, sometime in the mid-1950s, one day he experienced a rush of dialogues by characters from the Mahabharata in Kannada.

"I could actually hear the dialogues being spoken into my ears ... I was just the scribe," said Karnad in a later interview. Yayati was published in 1961, when he was 23 years old. It is based on the story of King Yayati, one of the ancestors of the Pandavas, who was cursed into premature old age by his preceptor, Shukracharya, who was incensed at Yayati's infidelity.

Yayati, in turn, asks his sons to sacrifice their youth for him, and one of them agrees. It ridicules the ironies of life through characters in Mahabharata. The play in Hindi was adapted by Satyadev Dubey and Amrish Puri was lead actor for the play. It became an instant success, immediately translated and staged in several other Indian languages.

Karnad found a new approach of drawing historical and mythological sources to tackle contemporary themes and existentialist crisis of modern man through characters locked in psychological and philosophical conflicts. His next was Tughlaq (1964), about a rashly idealist 14th-century Sultan of Delhi, Muhammad bin Tughluq, and allegory on the Nehruvian era which started with ambitious idealism and ended up in disillusionment. This established Karnad, now 26 years old, as a promising playwright in the country. It was staged by the National School of Drama Repertory under the direction of Ebrahim Alkazi, with the actor Manohar Singh, playing the visionary king who later becomes disillusioned and turns bitter, amidst the historic Purana Qila in Delhi. It was staged in London by the National School of Drama for the Festival of India in 1982.

Hayavadana (1971) was based on a theme drawn from The Transposed Heads, a 1940 novella by Thomas Mann, which is originally found in the 11th-century Sanskrit text Kathasaritsagara. Herein he employed the folk theatre form of Yakshagana. A German version of the play was directed by Vijaya Mehta as part of the repertoire of the Deutsches National Theatre, Weimar.

Naga-Mandala (Play with Cobra, 1988) was based on a folk tale related to him by A. K. Ramanujam, brought him the Karnataka Sahitya Academy Award for the Most Creative Work of 1989. It was directed by J. Garland Wright, as part of the celebrations of the 30th anniversary of Guthrie Theatre, Minneapolis. The theatre subsequently commissioned him to write the play, Agni Mattu Male (The Fire and the Rain). Though before it came Taledanda (Death by Beheading, 1990) which used the backdrop, the rise of Veerashaivism, a radical protest and reform movement in 12th century Karnataka to bring out current issues.

Movies
Karnad made his acting as well as screenwriting debut in a Kannada movie, Samskara (1970), based on a novel by U.R. Ananthamurthy and directed by Pattabhirama Reddy. That movie won the first President's Golden Lotus Award for Kannada cinema.

In television, he played the role of Swami's father in the TV series Malgudi Days (1986–1987), based on R. K. Narayan's books, directed by Kannada actor and director Shankar Nag. He also hosted the science magazine Turning Point on Doordarshan, in the early 1990s.

He made his directorial debut with Vamsha Vriksha (1971), based on a Kannada novel by S. L. Bhyrappa. It won him National Film Award for Best Direction along with B. V. Karanth, who co-directed the film. Later, Karnad directed several movies in Kannada and Hindi, including Godhuli (1977) and Utsav (1984). Karnad has made number of documentaries, like one on the Kannada poet D. R. Bendre (1972), Kanaka-Purandara (English, 1988) on two medieval Bhakti poets of Karnataka, Kanaka Dasa and Purandara Dasa, and The Lamp in the Niche (English, 1989) on Sufism and the Bhakti movement. Many of his films and documentaries have won several national and international awards.

Some of his famous Kannada movies include Tabbaliyu Neenade Magane, Ondanondu Kaladalli, Cheluvi and Kaadu and most recent film Kanooru Heggaditi (1999), based on a novel by Kannada writer Kuvempu.

His Hindi movies include Nishaant (1975), Manthan (1976), Swami (1977) and Pukar (2000). He has acted in a number of Nagesh Kukunoor films, starting with Iqbal (2005), where Karnad's role of the ruthless cricket coach got him critical acclaim. This was followed by Dor (2006), 8 x 10 Tasveer (2009) and Aashayein (2010). He played a key role in movies "Ek Tha Tiger" (2012) and its sequel "Tiger Zinda Hai" (2017) produced by Yash Raj Films.

Karnad has acted in the Kannada gangster movie Aa Dinagalu.

Other works
He provided the voice of A. P. J. Abdul Kalam, former President of India, in the audiobook of Kalam's autobiography by Charkha Audiobooks, Wings of Fire.

Awards and honours

For literature
 Rajyotsava Award – 1970
 Sangeet Natak Akademi award and Varthur navya Award – 1972
 Padma Shri – 1974
 Padma Bhushan – 1992
 Kannada Sahitya Parishat Award – 1992
 Sahitya Academy award – 1994
 Jnanapith Award – 1998
 Kalidas Samman – 1998
 Honorary doctorate by University of Southern California, Los Angeles – 2011

For cinema

National Film Awards

 1971: Best Direction: Vamsha Vriksha (with B. V. Karanth)
 1971: Best Feature Film in Kannada: Vamsha Vriksha
 1973: Second Best Feature Film: Kaadu
 1977: Best Feature Film in Kannada: Tabbaliyu Neenade Magane
 1978: Best Screenplay: Bhumika (with Shyam Benegal and Satyadev Dubey)
 1978: Best Feature Film in Kannada: Ondanondu Kaladalli
 1989: Best Non-Feature Film: Kanaka Purandara
 1990: Best Non-feature Film on Social Issues: The Lamp in the Niche
 1992: Best Film on Environment Conservation: Cheluvi
1999: Best Feature Film in Kannada: Kaanuru Heggadathi

Filmfare Awards South

 1972: Filmfare Award for Best Director - Kannada – Vamsha Vriksha
 1974: Filmfare Award for Best Director - Kannada – Kaadu
 1978: Filmfare Award for Best Director - Kannada – Ondanondu Kaladalli
 1983: Filmfare Award for Best Actor - Kannada - Ananda Bhairavi

Filmfare Awards Hindi

 1980: Filmfare Award for Best Screenplay: Godhuli (with B. V. Karanth)
 1980: Nominated - Filmfare Award for Best Supporting Actor: Aasha
 1982: Nominated - Filmfare Award for Best Supporting Actor: Teri Kasam

Karnataka State Film Awards

 1971-72: First Best Film – Vamsha Vriksha
 1971-72: Best Dialogue Writer – Vamsha Vriksha
 1973-74: Second Best Film – Kaadu
 1989-90: Best Supporting Actor – Santha Shishunala Sharifa
 1995-96: Best Supporting Actor – Sangeetha Sagara Ganayogi Panchakshara Gavai
 1999-00: Second Best Film – Kanooru Heggadithi

Others
 Gubbi Veeranna Award for his services to theatre (as a playwright)
 Karnad served as the director of the Film and Television Institute of India from 1974 to 1975, the Indian co-chairman for the Joint Media Committee of the Indo-US Sub-Commission on Education and Culture from 1984 to 1993, chairman of the Sangeet Natak Academy from 1988 to 1993, and president of Karnataka Nataka Academy from 1976 to 1978.
Honorary Doctorate from University of Southern California, Los Angeles – 2011
1996 -Dr.T.M.A.Pai Konkani Distinguished Achievement Award for Performing Arts

Controversies

At the Tata Literary Festival held in Mumbai in 2012, Karnad was invited to speak about "his life in theater" in an hour-long session. Instead of talking about the subject, he took the opportunity to lash out at V. S. Naipaul for his "antipathy towards Indian Muslims". V. S. Naipaul had earlier been conferred the Lifetime achievement award by the festival's organisers. Karnad also criticized the organizers for having honored Naipaul.

The audience, which had gathered to hear Karnad speak, had mixed reactions to the speech. Some, like organizer Anil Dharker, tried ineffectually to steer the speech toward less controversial waters. Others were amused by the episode, and some commented on the research and logic that had gone into the speech (unfortunately overshadowed by its 'scandalous' nature).

Just a few weeks after this, Karnad again created controversy by claiming that Rabindranath Tagore, who wrote India's national anthem, was a great poet but a second-rate playwright.

In November 2015, during celebrations marking the anniversary of 18th-century Muslim ruler Tipu Sultan's birth, Karnad stated that Bangalore International Airport should have been named after Tipu Sultan instead of Kempe Gowda. This created a furore among many people. Karnad apologised the following day.

Personal life
While working in Madras for Oxford University Press on his return from England, he met his future wife Saraswathi Ganapathy at a party. They decided to marry but the marriage was only formalised ten years later, when Karnad was 42 years old. Saraswathi was born to a Parsi mother, Nurgesh Mugaseth, and a Kodava Hindu father, Kodandera Ganapathy. The couple had two children. They lived in Bangalore.

Activism
He was a proponent of multiculturalism and freedom of expression. He was a critic of religious fundamentalism. He had publicly condemned the demolition of Babri Masjid in 1992 and later spoke against the attempts to create controversy about the Idgah Maidan in Hubli. He had opposed RSS, BJP and other organizations on several occasions. He opposed Narendra Modi for the Prime Minister's post in the 2014 parliament elections. He was one of the 200 writers who put out an open letter against hate politics and for “diverse and equal India” during the 2019 general elections. With a tube in his nose, he wore a placard saying "Me Too Urban Naxal" at the first death anniversary of slain journalist Gauri Lankesh. Karnad claimed that Tipu Sultan was the greatest king Karnataka had in 500 years, on a religious controversy about the king. Karnad was a supporter of the Forum for Communal Harmony.

Death
Karnad died on 10 June 2019 at Bengaluru at the age of 81 due to multiple organ failure following prolonged illness.

"After a discussion with his son, it was made clear to us that his last wish was to not have any floral procession, VVIPs or visits of any dignitaries. Hence, it will be a simple affair."

Bibliography

Plays in Kannada
 "Maa Nishaadha" (One Act Play)
 "Yayati" (1961)
 "Tughlaq" (1964) (translated in Hindustani by B. V. Karanth. Major Indian directors who have staged it: Ebrahim Alkazi, Prasanna, Arvind Gaur, Dinesh Thakur  & Shyamanand Jalan (in Bengali).
 "Hayavadana" (1971)
 "Anjumallige" (1977) (translated in Bengali name "JAMINI", by Dr. Biswa Roy, Director Film and T.V media. Published by Papyrus, in the year January 2007.  )
 "Hittina Hunja" aka "Bali" (The Sacrifice) (1980)
 "Nagamandala" (1988) (Play with Cobra), based on the script of this play, Nagamandala, A movie in Kannada language was released in 1997, starring Prakash Raj and Vijayalakshmi.
 "Taledanda" (1990) (Death by Beheading), in Hindi it is known as Rakt-Kalyan translated by Ram Gopal Bajaj, first directed by Ebrahim Alkazi for NSD rep., then by Arvind Gaur (1995–2008, still running) for Asmita Theater Group, New Delhi.
 "Agni mattu Male" (1995) (Agni Aur Varsha, The Fire and the Rain), first directed by Prasanna for NSD Rep.
 "Tipu Sultan Kanda Kanasu" (The Dreams of Tipu Sultan)
 "Odakalu Bimba" (2006) (Hindi, Bikre Bimb; English, A heap of Broken Images)
 "Maduve Album" (2006)
 "Flowers" (2012)
 "Benda Kaalu on Toast" (2012)
 "Rakshasa Tangadi" (2018)

Plays translated in English

Tughlaq, Oxford University Press.
Hayavadana, Oxford University Press.
Yayati, Oxford University Press.
Nagamandala: Play with Cobra, Oxford University Press.
Fire and the Rain, Oxford University Press, 1998.
Bali : The Sacrifice, Oxford University Press.
Tale Danda, Oxford University Press.
Wedding Album, Oxford University Press, 2006.
Boiled Beans on Toast, Oxford University Press, 2014.
Crossing to Talikota, Oxford University Press, 2019.
Collected Plays, Vol.1, Oxford University Press, New Delhi, 2005 (Tughlaq, Hayavadana, Bali: The Sacrifice, and Naga Mandala)
Collected Plays, Vol.2, Oxford University Press, 2005 (Tale-Danda, The Fire and the Rain, The Dreams of Tipu Sultan, Two Monologues: Flowers and Broken Images)

Filmography

Movies

TV series
 Malgudi Days (1987)
 as Swamy's father  in Swamy and Friends (Episodes 1 to 8)
 as the Watchman in The Watchman (episode 17)
 Indradhanush (1989) as Appu and Bala's father
 Khandaan (TV series)
 Apna Apna Aasman
 Swarajnama as the main host and director, aired on DD1 and Doordarshan

Movies directed

Production
 Om Namo (A mini series for Dooradarshan, directed by K M Chaitanya)
 Kusuma Bale (A mini series for Dooradarshan, directed by K M Chaitanya)

Other works
 Evam Indrajit (English) by Badal Sircar. Translated by Girish Karnad. 1974.

Works in translation
 Yayati. Oxford University Press.
 Yayati (Hindi). Tr. by B. R. Narayan. Rajkamal Prakashan Pvt Ltd, 2008. .
 Tughlaq: A play in 13 scenes, Oxford Univ. Press, 1972
 Tughlaq (Assamese). Translation Utpal Datta. Assam Publication Board. 2005
 Nagamandala (Assamese) Translation. Utpal Datta. Assam Publication Board. 2005
 Hayavadana, Oxford University Press, 1975.
 Tughlaq (Marathi), Tras. Vijay Tendulkar. Popular Prakashan Pvt. Ltd. .
 Three Plays: Naga-Mandala; Hayavadana; Tughlaq. Oxford University Press, 1996. .
 Tughlaq (Hindi). Tr. by B. V. Karanth. Rajkamal Prakashan Pvt Ltd, 2005. .
 Collected plays Vol 1: Tuglaq, Hayavadana, Bali: The Sacrifice, Naga-Mandala. Oxford University Press. 2005. .Collected Plays: Taledanda, the Fire and the Rain, the Dreams of Tipu Sultan, Flowers and Images: Two Dramatic Monologues: Flowers : Broken Images, Vol. 2. Oxford University Press, USA. 2005. .
 Three plays by Girish Karnad.  Oxford University Press. .
 Cheluvi (Assamese). Translation Utpal Datta.

Autobiography
 ‛Aadaadtha Aayushya’, published by Manohara Grantha Mala, 2011.

Notes

References
 
 
 
 

Further reading
 Jaydipsinh Dodiya, ed.,The Plays of Girish Karnad: Critical Perspectives Prestige Books, New Delhi, 1999.
 Pradeep Trikha, Multiple Celebrations, Celebrating Multiplicity in Girish Karnad – A Monograph Chhote Lal Khatri, Girish Karnad: Naga-mandala : a critique. Prakash Book Depot, 2006. .
 Dr. Prafull D. Kulkarni, The Dramatic World of Girish Karnad. Creative Books Nanded, 2010. .
 P Dhanavel, The Indian Imagination of Girish Karnad, Prestige Books, New Delhi, 2000.
 G Baskaran, ed., Girish Karnad and Mahesh Dattani: Methods and Motives, Yking Books, Jaipur, 2012.
 Vanashree Tripathi, Three Plays of Girish Karnad: Hayavadana, Tale-Danda, The Fire and the Rain, Prestige Books, New Delhi, 2004.
 
 Julia Leslie, "Nailed to the Past: Girish Karnad's Plays" Journal of South Asian Literature, 1999, 31–2 (for 1996–7), pp. 50–84. JSTOR
 Julia Leslie, "Understanding Basava: History, Hagiography and a Modern Kannada Drama" Bulletin of the School of Oriental and African Studies, 1998, 61, pp. 228–61. DOI
 Zinia Mitra " A Tale of Subversion with a Conundrum of Mask: A Reading into Girish Karnard's Naga Mandala" in  Indian Drama in English''   ed.K.Chakraborty, Delhi, PHI,2011,, INR:295.00 395 pp.
 Jolly Das. 'Tracing Karnad's Theatrical Trajectory: An Integrated Approach to His Life and Creativity'. New Delhi: Paragon, 2015.

External links 

Profile of Girish Karnad

Profile of Girish Karnad on Virtual Bangalore

Indian male film actors
20th-century Indian film directors
Indian socialists
Kannada-language writers
1938 births
2019 deaths
Konkani people
Alumni of Lincoln College, Oxford
Kannada dramatists and playwrights
20th-century Indian translators
Translators to English
Kannada screenwriters
People from Raigad district
Male actors in Hindi cinema
Male actors in Marathi cinema
Male actors in Kannada cinema
Hindi-language film directors
Kannada film directors
Indian Rhodes Scholars
Recipients of the Padma Bhushan in arts
Recipients of the Padma Shri in arts
Filmfare Awards winners
Recipients of the Sahitya Akademi Award in Kannada
Recipients of the Jnanpith Award
Male actors in Tamil cinema
Filmfare Awards South winners
Best Director National Film Award winners
Recipients of the Sangeet Natak Akademi Fellowship
Recipients of the Sangeet Natak Akademi Award
20th-century Indian male actors
Indian male screenwriters
Indian male dramatists and playwrights
20th-century Indian dramatists and playwrights
Screenwriters from Maharashtra
20th-century Indian male writers
Best Original Screenplay National Film Award winners
Directors who won the Best Film on Environment Conservation/Preservation National Film Award
Presidents of the Oxford Union
Karnatak University alumni